Gajānan Digambar Mādguḷkar (1 October 1919 – 14 December 1977) was a Marāthi poet, lyricist, writer and actor from India. He is popularly known in his home state of Mahārāshtra by just his initials as Ga Di Mā (गदिमा). He was awarded Sangeet Natak Akademi Award in 1951 and Padma Shri in 1969. He has written 157 screen plays and over 2000 songs in his career. He was called Ādhunik Valmiki (the modern Valmiki) of current era due to his composition of Geet Rāmāyan (lit. Ramayana in Songs) as the most notable work. 2019 is celebrated as his Birth Century year. Government of Maharashtra hosts various events and festivals to grace the occasion.

Career
Madgulkar wrote poetry, short stories, novels, autobiographies and scripts, dialogues and lyrics for Marathi as well as Hindi movies. His poems have been adapted to a wide range of musical forms such as Sugam-Sangeet (light music), Bhāwa-Geet (emotional songs), Bhakti-Geet (devotional songs), and Lāwani (a genre of folk songs in Maharashtra). Madgulkar entered the world of movies in 1938 at Kolhāpur. He contributed to 157 Marathi and 23 Hindi movies. He was also an artist. He loved to draw nature scenes.

He had knowledge of 10 languages including Marathi, Hindi, English, Urdu, Bengali, Gujarati, Punjabi, Kannada, Tamil and Telugu.

He was the elder brother of Marathi writer of poetry and novels Vyankatesh Madgulkar.

Works

Collections of poems

 Sugandhi Veena
 Jogiya
 Char sangitika
 Geet Ramayan
 Kavykatha
 Chaitraban
 Geetgopal
 Geetsaubhadra
 Vaishakhi
 Pooriya
 Ajun Gagima
 Naach re mora

Collection of short stories

 Laplele ogh
 Bandhavarchya babhali
 Krushnachi karangali
 Bolka shankh
 Veg ani itar katha
 Thorli pati
 Tupacha nandadeep
 Chandani udbatti
 Bhatache phool
 Sone ani mati
 Teen chitrakatha
 Kalavantanche anand paryatan
 Teel ani tandul

Autobiographies
 Vatevarlya savlya
 Mantarlele diwas

Novels

 De tali ga ghe tali
 Mini
 Shashank manjiri
 Naach re mora
 Tulsi ramayan
 Shabdranjan
 Aakashachi phale
 Ubhe dhage aadve dhage

Plays
 Aakashachi phale
 Parachakra

Monthly magazines
 Akshar
 Dharti

Geet Ramayan

Geet Rāmāyan (lit. Ramayana in Songs) is considered his most notable work. A lyrical version of the Valmiki Ramayana in Marathi, it consists of 56 songs chronologically describing events from Ramayana. Sudhir Phadke composed the music for Geet Ramayan. Though it is based on sage Valmiki's epic Ramayana, Madgulkar chose a different narrative format and was praised for the lyrics, and was called Ādhunik Valmiki (the modern Valmiki).

Screenwriting
 जीवनज्योती Jeewan Jyoti 1953: Screenplay and Dialogs
 तूफान और दीया Toofān Aur Deeyā 1956: Story
 दो आंखे बारह हाथ Do Ānkhen Bārah Hāth 1957: Story, Screenplay, and Dialogs - the movie  won recognition at Berlin International Film Festival.

Popular Songs
The following is a short list of some of the popular Marathi songs which "गदिमा" wrote:

 इंद्रायणीकाठी देवाची आळंदी (Indrāyani Kāthi Dewāchi Ālandi)
 उद्धवा, अजब तुझे सरकार (Uddhawā, Ajab Tujhze Sarkār)
 तुझ्या उसाला लागल कोल्हा (Tujhyā Usaālā Lāgel Kolhā)
 या चिमण्यानो, परत फिरा रे (Yā Chimanyāno, Parat Phirā Re)
 हे काम ने तडीला, हाजी मलंग बाबा (He Kām Ne Tadilā, Hāji Malang Bābā)
 विठ्ठला,तू वेडा कुंभार (Viththalā, Tu Wedā Kumbhār)

Acting

Awards and recognitions
 Sangeet Natak Akademi Award – 1951
 Padma Shri – 1969
 Vishnudas Bhave gold medal -1971

Personal life
Madgulkar was born in a Deshashtha Brahmin family. He was married to Vidya (née Patankar, from Kolhapur) and they had 3 sons (Shridhar, Anand, Sharatkumar) and 4 daughters (Varsha, Kalpalata, Deepa, Shubhada). The popular Marathi writer, Vyankatesh Madgulkar was his younger brother.

His home  in Pune ('Panchavati Bungalow') has become a place of attraction for his fans.

Further reading
(Autobiography)

References

External links
Marathi Songs Of Ga Di Madgulkar – The Official Gadima Website
Gadima On Facebook – The Official Gadima Facebook Page

Hindu poets
Marathi-language writers
Marathi-language poets
Male actors in Marathi cinema
1919 births
1977 deaths
Recipients of the Sangeet Natak Akademi Award
Screenwriters from Maharashtra
Indian male screenwriters
20th-century Indian poets
20th-century Indian male actors
People from Sangli district
People from Ratnagiri district
Recipients of the Padma Shri in literature & education
Male actors from Maharashtra
Poets from Maharashtra
Novelists from Maharashtra
20th-century Indian male writers
Presidents of the Akhil Bharatiya Marathi Sahitya Sammelan
20th-century Indian screenwriters